Islamic architecture comprises the architectural styles of buildings associated with Islam. It encompasses both secular and religious styles from the early history of Islam to the present day. The Islamic world encompasses a wide geographic area historically ranging from western Africa and Europe to eastern Asia. Certain commonalities are shared by Islamic architectural styles across all these regions, but over time different regions developed their own styles according to local materials and techniques, local dynasties and patrons, different regional centers of artistic production, and sometimes different religious affiliations.

Early Islamic architecture was influenced by Roman, Byzantine, Iranian, and Mesopotamian architecture and all other lands which the Early Muslim conquests conquered in the seventh and eighth centuries. Further east, it was also influenced by Chinese and Indian architecture as Islam spread to South and Southeast Asia. Later it developed distinct characteristics in the form of buildings and in the decoration of surfaces with Islamic calligraphy, arabesques, and geometric motifs. New architectural elements like minarets, muqarnas, and multifoil arches were invented. Common or important types of buildings in Islamic architecture include mosques, madrasas, tombs, palaces, hammams (public baths), Sufi hospices (e.g. khanqahs or zawiyas), fountains and sabils, commercial buildings (e.g. caravanserais and bazaars), and military fortifications.

Early history (up to 10th century)

Origins 

The Islamic era began with the formation of Islam under the leadership of Muhammad in early 7th-century Arabia. The first mosque was a structure built by Muhammad in Medina in 622, right after his Hijrah (migration) from Mecca, which corresponds to the site of the present-day Mosque of the Prophet (al-Masjid an-Nabawi). It is usually described as his house, but may have been designed to serve as a community center from the beginning. It consisted of a simple courtyard structure built in unbaked brick, with a rectangular, almost square, floor plan measuring about 53 by 56 meters. A shaded portico supported by palm trunks stood on the north side of the courtyard, in the direction of prayer (the qibla), which was initially towards Jerusalem. When the qibla was changed to face towards Mecca in 624, a similar portico was added on the south side, facing towards that city. Muhammad and his family lived in separate rooms attached to the mosque, and Muhammad himself was buried in one of these rooms upon his death in 632. Over the rest of the 7th century and in the 8th century the mosque was repeatedly expanded to include a large flat-roofed prayer hall supported by columns (a hypostyle hall) with a central courtyard. It became one of the main models for the early mosques built elsewhere. Scholars generally agree that aside from Muhammad's mosque/house, the architecture of the Arabian Peninsula seems to have had only a limited role in the formulation of later Islamic architecture.

Prior to the start of the Arab-Muslim conquests of the 7th century, the two major powers in the Middle East and the eastern Mediterranean world were the Byzantine (Eastern Roman) Empire and the Sasanian Empire. These two empires both cultivated their own major architectural traditions. Occupying the borderlands between these two empires – in the desert and steppe regions of Syria, Palestine, Mesopotamia and northern Arabia – were two Arab tribal client states: the Lakhmids, who were clients of the Sasanians and had their capital at al-Hira (in present-day Iraq), and the Ghassanids, who were clients of the Byzantines and protected their eastern borders. These two Arab dynasties were significant patrons of architecture in their respective regions. Their architecture is not well understood due to the scarcity of identifiable remains today, but they borrowed and adapted the architecture of their Byzantine and Sasanian suzerains. Some of their buildings are known from archeology or historical texts, such as the Lakhmid palaces of Khawarnaq and al-Sadir in al-Hira, a Ghassanid church with mosaic decoration at Nitil (near Madaba), and a Ghassanid audience hall incorporated into the later Umayyad rural residence at ar-Rusafa. The culture and architecture of the Lakhmids and Ghassanids probably played a subsequent role in transmitting and filtering the architectural traditions of the Sasanian and the Byzantine/Roman worlds to the later Arab Islamic dynasties who established their political centers in the same regions.

When the early Arab-Muslim conquests spread out from the Arabian Peninsula in the 7th century and advanced across the Middle East and North Africa, new garrison cities were established in the conquered territories, such as Fustat in Egypt and Kufa in present-day Iraq. The central congregational mosques of these cities were built in the hypostyle format. In other cities, especially in Syria, new mosques were established by converting or occupying parts of existing churches in existing cities, as for example in Damascus and Hama. These early mosques had no minaret, although small shelters may have been constructed on the roofs to protect the muezzin while issuing the call to prayer.

Umayyad and Abbasid eras 

The Umayyad Caliphate (661–750) combined elements of Byzantine architecture and Sasanian architecture, but Umayyad architecture introduced new combinations of these styles. The reuse of elements from classical Roman and Byzantine art was still widely evident because political power and patronage was centered in Syria, a former Roman/Byzantine province. Some former Ghassanid structures also appear to have been reused and modified during this period. However, a significant amount of experimentation occurred as Umayyad patrons recruited craftsmen from across the empire and architects were allowed, or even encouraged, to mix elements from different artistic traditions and to disregard traditional conventions and restraints. Partly as a result of this, Umayyad architecture is distinguished by the extent and variety of decoration, including mosaics, wall painting, sculpture and carved reliefs. While figural scenes were notably present in monuments like Qusayr 'Amra, non-figural decoration and more abstract scenes became highly favoured, especially in religious architecture.

The Umayyads were the first to add the mihrab to mosque design, a concave niche in the qibla wall of the mosque. The first mihrab reportedly appeared at Muhammad's mosque in Medina when it was rebuilt by al-Walid I in 707. It seems to have represented the place where the Prophet stood when leading prayer. This almost immediately became a standard feature of all mosques. In hypostyle mosques, the Umayyads also introduced the tradition of making the "nave" or aisle in front of the mihrab wider than the others, dividing the prayer room along its central axis. Several major early monuments of Islamic architecture built under the Umayyads include the Dome of the Rock in Jerusalem (built by Caliph Abd al-Malik) and the Great Mosque of Damascus (built by al-Walid I). The Al-Aqsa Mosque on the Haram al-Sharif, also in Jerusalem, was also rebuilt by al-Walid I, replacing an earlier simple structure built around 670. Both the al-Aqsa Mosque and the Great Mosque of Damascus featured a hypostyle hall and a dome above the space in front of the mihrab, and both were influential in the design of later mosques elsewhere. A number of palaces from this period have also partially survived or have been excavated in modern times. The horseshoe arch appears for the first time in Umayyad architecture, later to evolve to its most advanced form in al-Andalus (Iberian Peninsula).

The Abbasid architecture of the Abbasid Caliphate (750–1513) was particularly influenced by Sasanian architecture, which in turn featured elements present since ancient Mesopotamia. Other influences such as ancient Soghdian architecture in Central Asia have also been noted. This was partly a result of the caliphate's political center shifting further east to the new capital of Baghdad, in present-day Iraq. Features from the late Umayyad period, such as vaulting, carved stucco, and painted wall decoration, were continued and elaborated in the Abbasid period. Abbasid mosques all followed the courtyard plan with hypostyle halls. The earliest was the mosque that Caliph al-Mansur built in Baghdad (since destroyed). The Great Mosque of Samarra built by al-Mutawakkil measured , had a flat wooden roof supported by columns, and was decorated with marble panels and glass mosaics. The prayer hall of the Abu Dulaf Mosque at Samarra had arcades on rectangular brick piers running at right angles to the qibla wall. Both of the Samarra mosques have spiral minarets, the only examples in Iraq. A mosque at Balkh in what is now Afghanistan was about  square, with three rows of three square bays, supporting nine vaulted domes. While the origins of the minaret are uncertain, it is believed that the first true minarets appeared in this period. Several of the Abbasid mosques built in the early ninth century had minaret towers which stood at the northern ends of the building, opposite the central mihrab. Among the most famous of these is the Malwiyya minaret, a stand-alone tower with a "spiral" form built for the Great Mosque of Samarra.

Early regional styles 

After the overthrow of the Umayyad Caliphate in 750 by the Abbasids, a new branch of the Umayyad dynasty succeeded in taking control of Al-Andalus in 756, creating the Emirate of Cordoba and reaching the apogee of its power during the Caliphate of Cordoba in the 10th century. The Great Mosque at Córdoba, built in 785–786, marks the earliest major monument of Moorish architecture in the Iberian Peninsula (Al-Andalus). This style of architecture established in Al-Andalus was also largely shared with the architecture of western North Africa (the Maghreb), from which later empires in the region would also emerge and contribute to its artistic evolution. The original Great Mosque of Cordoba was noted for its unique hypostyle hall with rows of double-tiered, two-coloured, arches, which were repeated and maintained in later extensions of the building. The mosque was expanded multiple times, with the expansion by al-Hakam II (r. 961–976) introducing important aesthetic innovations such as interlacing arches and ribbed domes, which were imitated and elaborated in later monuments in the region. The construction of Madinat al-Zahra, a new capital and monumental palace-city in the 10th century, also created an important complex of royal architecture and patronage. Smaller monuments such as the early form of the Qarawiyyin Mosque in Fez (present-day Morocco) and the Bab al-Mardum Mosque in Toledo demonstrate the prevalence of the same stylistic elements across the region.

After its initial apogee of power, the Abbasid Caliphate became partly fragmented into regional states in the 9th century which were formally obedient to the caliphs in Baghdad but were de facto independent. The Aghlabids in Ifriqiya (roughly modern-day Tunisia) were notable patrons of architecture themselves, responsible for rebuilding both the Great Mosque of Kairouan (originally founded by Uqba ibn Nafi in 670) and the Zaytuna Mosque of Tunis in much of their current forms, as well as for building numerous other structures in the region. In Egypt, Ahmad ibn Tulun established a short-lived dynasty, the Tulunids, and built himself a new capital (Al-Qata'i) and a new congregational mosque, known as the Ibn Tulun Mosque, which was completed in 879. It was strongly influenced by Abbasid architecture in Samarra and remains one of the most notable and best-preserved examples of 9th-century architecture from the Abbasid Caliphate.

In the 10th century the Fatimid Caliphate rose to power in Ifriqiya, where it built a new fortified capital at Mahdia. In 970 the Fatimids moving their center of power to Egypt and they founded another new capital, Cairo. Fatimid architecture in Egypt followed Tulunid techniques and used similar materials, but also developed some of its own. The first Fatimid congregational mosque in Cairo was al-Azhar Mosque, founded at the same time as the city (970), which became the spiritual center for the Ismaili Shi'a branch of Islam. Other notable monuments include the large Mosque of al-Hakim (founded in 990 under al-'Aziz but completed around 1013 under al-Hakim), the small Aqmar Mosque (1125) with its richly-decorated street façade, and the domed Mashhad of Sayyida Ruqayya (1133), notable for its mihrab of elaborately-carved stucco. Under the powerful vizier Badr al-Jamali (r. 1073–1094), the city walls were rebuilt in stone along with several monumental gates, three of which have survived to the present-day: Bab al-Futuh, Bab al-Nasr, and Bab Zuweila).

Characteristics

Gardens 

Gardens and water have for many centuries played an essential role in Islamic culture, and are often compared to the garden of Paradise. The comparison originates from the Achaemenid Empire. In his dialogue "Oeconomicus", Xenophon has Socrates relate the story of the Spartan general Lysander's visit to the Persian prince Cyrus the Younger, who shows the Greek his "Paradise at Sardis". The classical form of the Persian Paradise garden, or the charbagh, comprises a rectangular irrigated space with elevated pathways, which divide the garden into four sections of equal size:

One of the hallmarks of Persian gardens is the four-part garden laid out with axial paths that intersect at the garden's centre. This highly structured geometrical scheme, called the chahar bagh, became a powerful metaphor for the organization and domestication of the landscape, itself a symbol of political territory.

A Charbagh from Achaemenid time has been identified in the archaeological excavations at Pasargadae. The gardens of Chehel Sotoun  (Isfahan), Fin Garden (Kashan), Eram Garden (Shiraz), Shazdeh Garden (Mahan), Dowlatabad Garden (Yazd), Abbasabad Garden (Abbasabad), Akbarieh Garden (South Khorasan Province), Pahlevanpour Garden, all in Iran, form part of the UNESCO World Heritage. Large Paradise gardens are also found at the Taj Mahal (Agra), and at Humayun's Tomb (New Delhi), in India; the Shalimar Gardens (Lahore, Pakistan) or at the Alhambra and Generalife in Granada, Spain.

Courtyards 

In the architecture of the Muslim world courtyards are found in secular and religious structures.
 Residences and other secular buildings typically contain a central private courtyard or walled garden. This was also called the wast ad-dar ("middle of the house") in Arabic. The tradition of courtyard houses was already widespread in the ancient Mediterranean world and Middle East, as seen in Greco-Roman houses (e.g. the Roman domus). The use of this space included the aesthetic effects of plants and water, the penetration of natural light, allowing breezes and air circulation into the structure during summer heat, as a cooler space with water and shade, and as a protected and proscribed place where the women of the house need not be covered in the hijab clothing traditionally necessary in public.

 A ṣaḥn is the formal courtyard found in almost every mosque in Islamic architecture. The courtyards are open to the sky and surrounded on all sides by structures with halls and rooms, and often a shaded semi-open arcade riwaq. A mosque courtyard is used for performing ablutions and as a patio for rest or gathering. Sahns usually feature a central pool or fountain to aid with ablutions, sometimes sheltered under an open domed pavilion. Historically, because of the warm Mediterranean and Middle Eastern climates, the courtyard also served to accommodate larger numbers of worshippers during Friday prayers.

Hypostyle hall 
A hypostyle, i.e., an open hall supported by columns, is considered to be derived from architectural traditions of Achaemenid period Persian assembly halls (apadana). This type of building originated from the Roman-style basilica with an adjacent courtyard surrounded by colonnades, like Trajan's Forum in Rome. The Roman type of building has developed out of the Greek agora. In Islamic architecture, the hypostyle hall is the main feature of the hypostyle mosque. One of the earliest hypostyle mosques is the Tarikhaneh Mosque in Iran, dating back to the eighth century.

Some scholars refer to the early hypostyle mosque with courtyard as the "Arab plan" or "Arab-type" mosque. Such mosques were constructed mostly under the Umayyad and Abbasid dynasties; subsequently, however, the simplicity of this type of plan limited the opportunities for further development, and as a result, these mosques gradually fell out of popularity in some regions.

Vaulting 
In Islamic buildings, vaulting follows two distinct architectural styles: While Umayyad architecture in the west continues Syrian traditions of the sixth and seventh century, eastern Islamic architecture was mainly influenced by Sasanian styles and forms.

Umayyad diaphragm arches and barrel vaults 

In their vaulting structures, Umayyad period buildings show a mixture of ancient Roman and Persian architectural traditions. Diaphragm arches with lintelled ceilings made of wood or stone beams, or, alternatively, with barrel vaults, were known in the Levant since the classical and Nabatean period. They were mainly used to cover houses and cisterns. The architectural form of covering diaphragm arches with barrel vaults, however, was likely newly introduced from Iranian architecture, as similar vaulting was not known in Bilad al-Sham before the arrival of the Umayyads. However, this form was well known in Iran from early Parthian times, as exemplified in the Parthian buildings of Aššur. The earliest known example for barrel vaults resting on diaphragm arches from Umayyad architecture is known from Qasr Harane in Syria. During the early period, the diaphragm arches are built from coarsely cut limestone slabs, without using supporting falsework, which were connected by gypsum mortar. Later-period vaults were erected using pre-formed lateral ribs modelled from gypsum, which served as a temporal formwork to guide and center the vault. These ribs, which were left in the structure afterwards, do not carry any load. The ribs were cast in advance on strips of cloth, the impression of which can still be seen in the ribs today. Similar structures are known from Sasanian architecture, for example from the palace of Firuzabad. Umayyad-period vaults of this type were found in Amman Citadel and in Qasr Amra.

Iwans 

An iwan is a hall that is walled on three sides and open on one side. It is typically covered by a vault although this can vary. This feature was present in Sasanian architecture, though its exact origins are older and still debated. It was later incorporated into Islamic architecture. Its usage became more common and widespread under the Seljuks in the 10th century. Iwans were used in a variety of ways and arranged in varying positions in relation to the rest of the building. They are found in many types of buildings including mosques, madrasas, palaces, and caravanserais.
A common layout is the four-iwan plan.

The related Persian term, means the entrance portal (sometimes an iwan) projecting from the façade of a building, often decorated with calligraphy bands, glazed tilework, and geometric designs.

Domes

Domes in Iran and Central Asia 
Because of its long history of building and re-building, spanning the time from the Abbasids to the Qajar dynasty, and its excellent state of conservation, the Jameh Mosque of Isfahan provides an overview over the experiments Islamic architects conducted with complicated vaulting structures.

The system of squinches, which is a construction filling in the upper angles of a square room so as to form a base to receive an octagonal or spherical dome, was already known in Sasanian architecture. The spherical triangles of the squinches were split up into further subdivisions or systems of niches, resulting in a complex interplay of supporting structures forming an ornamental spatial pattern which hides the weight of the structure.

The tradition of double-shelled brick domes in Iran has been traced back to the 11th century. At the beginning of the 15th century, major Timurid monuments like the Gur-i Amir Mausoleum and the Bibi Khanum Mosque (both completed around 1404) were notable in their use of large double-shelled domes. These domes were composed of an inner shell which was visible from the interior and a larger outer shell, visible from the exterior and often of a slightly different shape. The Gur-i Amir Mausoleum's dome, the oldest one to have survived to the present day, features an exterior ribbed profile with a band of muqarnas around its drum. However, domes of this shape and style were likely constructed earlier, as evidenced by the Sultaniyya Mausoleum in Cairo, which was built earlier in the 1350s and appears to have copied this same design from the Iranian tradition.

The "non-radial rib vault", an architectural form of ribbed vaults with a superimposed spherical dome, is the characteristic architectural vault form of the Islamic East. From its beginnings in the Jameh Mosque of Isfahan, this form of vault was used in a sequence of important buildings up to the period of Safavid architecture. Its main characteristics are:
 four intersecting ribs, at times redoubled and intersected to form an eight-pointed star;
 the omission of a transition zone between the vault and the supporting structure;
 a central dome or roof lantern on top of the ribbed vault.

While intersecting pairs of ribs from the main decorative feature of Seljuk architecture, the ribs were hidden behind additional architectural elements in later periods, as exemplified in the dome of the Tomb of Ahmed Sanjar in Merv, until they finally disappeared completely behind the double shell of a stucco dome, as seen in the dome of Ālī Qāpū in Isfahan.

Domes in South Asia 

The use of domes in South Asia started with the establishment of Delhi sultanate in 1204 CE. Unlike Ottoman domes, and even more so than Persian domes, domes in South Asia tend to be more bulbous. Many monumental Mughal domes were also double-shelled and derived from the Iranian tradition. The design of the Tomb of Humayun (completed around 1571–72), including its double-shelled dome, suggests that its architects were familiar with Timurid monuments in Samarqand. The central dome of the Taj Mahal likewise features a bulbous profile and a double-shelled construction.

Ribbed domes in Al-Andalus and the Maghreb 

The Great Mosque of Córdoba in Al-Andalus was initially built with a system of double-arched arcades supporting the flat timberwork ceiling. The columns of the arcades are connected by horseshoe arches which support brick pillars, which are in turn interconnected by semicircular arches. This arcade system was copied during the mosque's subsequent expansions, but the expansion by al-Hakam II after 961 also introduced a series of ornate ribbed domes. Three domes span the vaults in front of the mihrab wall while another one covers an area now known by its Spanish name, the Capilla de Villaviciosa, located several bays before the mihrab. In sections which now supporting these domes, additional supporting structures were needed to bear the thrust of the cupolas. The architects solved this problem by the construction of intersecting arches. The domes themselves are built with eight intersecting stone ribs. Rather than meeting in the centre of the dome, the ribs intersect one another off-center, leaving the central space to be occupied by a smaller cupola. For the domes in front of the mihrab, the ribs form an eight-pointed star and an octagonal cupola in the centre. For the dome over the Capilla de Villaviciosa, the ribs leave a central square space between them, with an octagonal cupola added over this.

The ribbed domes of the Mosque-Cathedral of Córdoba served as models for later mosque buildings in the Islamic West of Al-Andalus and the Maghreb. At around 1000 AD, the Bab al-Mardum Mosque in Toledo was constructed with a similar, eight-ribbed dome, surrounded by eight other ribbed domes of varying design. Similar domes are also seen in the mosque building of the Aljafería of Zaragoza. The architectural form of the ribbed dome was further developed in the Maghreb: the central dome of the Great Mosque of Tlemcen, a masterpiece of the Almoravids founded in 1082, has twelve slender ribs, the shell between the ribs is filled with filigree stucco work.

Ottoman domes 

Based on the model of pre-existing Byzantine domes, Ottoman architecture developed a specific form of monumental, representative building: wide central domes with huge diameters were erected on top of a centre-plan building. Despite their enormous weight, the domes appear virtually weightless. Some of the most elaborate domed buildings have been constructed by the Ottoman architect Mimar Sinan.

When the Ottomans had conquered Constantinople, they found a variety of Byzantine Christian churches, the largest and most prominent amongst them was the Hagia Sophia. The brickwork-and-mortar ribs and the spherical shell of the central dome of the Hagia Sophia were built simultaneously, as a self-supporting structure without any wooden centring. In the early Byzantine church of Hagia Irene, the ribs of the dome vault are fully integrated into the shell, similar to Western Roman domes, and thus are not visible from within the building. In the dome of the Hagia Sophia, the ribs and shell of the dome unite in a central medallion at the apex of the dome, the upper ends of the ribs being integrated into the shell; shell and ribs form one single structural entity. In later Byzantine buildings, like the Kalenderhane Mosque, the Eski Imaret Mosque (formerly the Monastery of Christ Pantepoptes) or the Pantokrator Monastery (today Zeyrek Mosque), the central medallion of the apex and the ribs of the dome became separate structural elements: the ribs are more pronounced and connect to the central medallion, which also stands out more pronouncedly, so that the entire construction gives the impression as if ribs and medallion are separate from, and underpin, the proper shell of the dome. Elaborately decorated ceilings and dome interiors draw influence from Near Eastern and Mediterranean architectural decoration while also serving as explicit and symbolic representations of the heavens. These dome shaped architectural features could be seen at the early Islamic palaces such as Qusayr ῾amra (c.712–15) and Khirbat al-mafjar (c.724–43).

Mimar Sinan solved the structural issues of the Hagia Sophia dome by constructing a system of centrally symmetric pillars with flanking semi-domes, as exemplified by the design of the Süleymaniye Mosque (four pillars with two flanking shield walls and two semi-domes, 1550–1557), the Rüstem Pasha Mosque (eight pillars with four diagonal semi-domes, 1561–1563), and the Selimiye Mosque in Edirne (eight pillars with four diagonal semi-domes, 1567/8–1574/5). In the history of architecture, the structure of the Selimiye Mosque has no precedent. All elements of the building are subordinate to its great dome.

Balconies and screens 
Balconies are a common feature of Islamic domestic architecture due to the warm climates in most countries. One of the mosque recognizable types is the mashrabiya, a wooden lattice screen which projects from the side of a building and which protected privacy by allowed those inside to look outside without being visible from outside. Another type of lattice screen, not restricted to balconies, is the jali, which is common to Indo-Islamic architecture and is made of perforated stone. Other examples of balconies and related structures include the jharokha in Rajasthani and Indo-Islamic architecture and the mirador, a Spanish term applied to a balcony or lookout pavilion in Andalusi palaces like the Alhambra. Balconies also became an architectural element inside some mosques, such as the hünkâr mahfili in Ottoman mosques, a separate and protected space where the sultan could perform his prayers (similar to a maqsura). A similar feature is also found in the Bara Gunbad complex (late 15th century) in Delhi.

Ornamentation 

As a common feature, Islamic architecture makes use of specific ornamental forms, including mathematically complicated, elaborate geometric patterns, floral motifs like the arabesque, and elaborate calligraphic inscriptions. The geometric or floral, interlaced forms, taken together, constitute an infinitely repeated pattern that extends beyond the visible material world. Figural motifs, such as animals, humans, and imaginary creatures, have a rich tradition in Islamic art, though they generally more stylized than naturalistic. However, because of the religious taboo on figural representations, non-figural decoration remained more dominant overall and figural motifs were generally excluded from religious buildings entirely.

The importance of the written word in Islam ensured that epigraphic or calligraphic decoration played a prominent role in architecture. Epigraphic decoration can also indicate further political or religious messages through the selection of a textual program of inscriptions. For example, the calligraphic inscriptions adorning the Dome of the Rock include quotations from the Qur'an that reference the miracle of Jesus and his human nature (e.g. Quran 19:33–35), the oneness of God (e.g. Qur'an 112), and the role of Muhammad as the "Seal of the Prophets", which have been interpreted as an attempt to announce the rejection of the Christian concept of the Holy Trinity and to proclaim the triumph of Islam over Christianity and Judaism. Additionally, foundation inscriptions on buildings commonly indicate its founder or patron, the date of its construction, the name of the reigning sovereign, and other information.

These decorative motifs are expressed in a range of mediums, including stone carving, brickwork, carved stucco, tilework, paint, glass mosaics, marble or stone paneling, and stained glass windows. Capitals, the upper part or crowing feature of a column, serve as a transition piece and are often decoratively carved. They range greatly in design and shape in Islamic Architecture. Early Islamic buildings in Iran featured "Persian" type capitals which included designs of bulls heads, while Mediterranean structures displayed a more classical influence.

Muqarnas 

Muqarnas is a three-dimensional sculpted motif created by the geometric subdivision of a vaulting structure into miniature, superimposed pointed-arch substructures or niches, also known as "honeycomb" or "stalactite" vaults. They can be made from different materials like stone, brick, wood or stucco. The earliest monuments to make use of this feature date from the 11th century and are found in Iraq, North Africa, Iran, Central Asia, and Upper Egypt. This apparently near-simultaneous development in distant regions of the Islamic world has led to multiple scholarly theories about their origin and spread, with one current theory proposing that they originated in one region at least a century earlier and then spread from there. Some of the earliest surviving examples preserved in situ are tripartite squinches used as transitional elements for domes and semi-domes, such as at the Arab-Ata Mausoleum (977–978) in Tim (Uzbekistan), the Gunbad-i Qabus (1006–1007) in northeastern Iran, and the Duvazdah Imam Mausoleum (1037–1038) in Yazd. From the 12th century onward its usage became common across the Islamic world and different local styles developed over time. In addition to serving as squinches and pendentives, muqarnas was also employed to decorate cornices, portals, mihrabs, windows, arches, and entire domes.

Other elements of religious architecture

Qibla orientation 

The qiblah is the direction in which Mecca is from any given location, towards which Muslims face during prayers. Within Islamic architecture it is a major component of both the features and the orientation of the building itself. Mosques and religious structures are built to have one side aligned with this direction, usually marked by a visual feature called a mihrab. The layout of some Muslim cities may have also been influenced by this orientation. In practice, however, the qibla alignments of mosques built in different periods and locations do not all point to the same place. This is due to discrepancies in the calculations of the Islamic scientists in the past who determined where Mecca was from their individual locations. Scholars note that these differences come about for a multitude of reasons, such as some misunderstanding the meaning of qibla itself, the fact that the geographic coordinates of the past do not line up with the coordinates of today, and that the determination of this direction was more an astronomical calculation, rather than a mathematical one. Early mosques were constructed according to either the calculations of what direction qibla was approximately, or with the mihrab facing south, as that was the direction that Muhammad was facing when he prayed in Medina, which is a city directly north of Mecca.

Mihrab 

The mihrab is a niche or alcove, typically concave, set into the qibla wall (the wall standing in the direction of prayer) of a mosque or other prayer space. It symbolized and indicated the direction of the qibla to worshippers. It also acquired ritual and ceremonial importance over time, and its shape was even used as a symbol on some coinage. The very first mosques did not have mihrabs; the first known concave mihrab niche was the one added to the Prophet's Mosque in Medina by Caliph al-Walid I in 706 or 707. In later mosques the mihrab evolved to become the usual focus of architectural decoration in the building. The details of its shape and materials varied from region to region. In congregational mosques, the mihrab was usually flanked by a minbar (pulpit), and some historical mosques also included a nearby maqsura (a protected space for the ruler during prayers).

Minaret 

The minaret is a tower that traditionally accompanies a mosque building. The call to prayer is issued five times each day: dawn, noon, mid-afternoon, sunset, and night.

The origin of the minaret and its initial functions are not clearly known and have long been a topic of scholarly discussion. The earliest mosques lacked minarets, and the call to prayer was often performed from smaller tower structures. The early Muslim community of Medina gave the call to prayer from the doorway or the roof of the house of Muhammad, which doubled as a place for prayer. The first confirmed minarets in the form of towers date from the early 9th century under Abbasid rule and they did not become a standard feature of mosques until the 11th century. These first minaret towers were placed in the middle of the wall opposite the qibla wall. Among them, the minaret of the Great Mosque of Kairouan in Tunisia, dating from 836, is one of the oldest surviving minarets in the world and the oldest in North Africa. It has the shape of a massive tower with a square base, three levels of decreasing widths, and a total height of 31.5 meters.

Minarets have had various forms (in general round, squared, spiral or octagonal) depending on the period and architectural tradition. The number of minarets by mosques is not fixed; originally one minaret would accompany each mosque, but some architectural styles can include multiple minarets.

Towns and cities

Urban and nomadic life according to Ibn Khaldun 
During its history, the society of the pre-modern Islamic world was dominated by two important social contexts, nomadic life and Urbanism. The historian and politician Ibn Khaldun thoroughly discusses both concepts in his book Muqaddimah. According to him, the way of life and culture of the rural bedouin nomads and the townspeople are opposed in a central social conflict. Ibn Khaldun explains the rise and fall of civilizations by his concept of Asabiyyah ("bond of cohesion", or "family loyalty"), as exemplified by the rule of the caliphs. Bedouins, being the nomadic inhabitants of the steppe and the desert, are interconnected by strong bonds of asabiyyah and firm religious beliefs. These bonds tend to slacken in urban communities over some generations. In parallel, by losing their asabiyyah, the townspeople also lose the power to defend themselves, and fall victims to more aggressive tribes which may destroy the city and set up a new ruling dynasty, which over time is subject to the same weakening of power again.

Experiments with various ideal city models 
The antique concept of the architecture of a metropolis is based on a structure of main and smaller roads running through the entire city, and dividing it into quarters. The streets are oriented towards public buildings like a palace, temple, or a public square. Two main roads, (cardo and decumanus) cross each other at right angles in the center of the city. A few cities were founded during the early Islamic Umayyad Caliphate, the outlines of which were based on the Ancient Roman concept of the ideal city. An example of a city planned according to such concepts was excavated at Anjar in Lebanon. Donald Whitcomb argues that the early Muslim conquests initiated a conscious attempt to recreate specific morphological features characteristic of earlier western and southwestern Arabian cities.

Transformation of conquered towns 
More often than founding new cities, the new Islamic rulers took over existing towns, and transformed them according to the needs of the new Islamic society. This process of transformation proved to be decisive for the development of the traditional Islamic city, or Medina. The principle of arranging buildings is known as "horizontal spread". Residencies and public buildings as well as private housing tend to be laid out separately, and are not directly related to each other architectonically. Archaeological excavations at the city of Jerash, the Gerasa of Antiquity, have revealed how the Umayyads have transformed the city plan.

Urban morphology of the Medina 
The architecture of the "oriental"-Islamic town is based on cultural and sociological concepts which differ from those of European cities. In both cultures, a distinction is made between the areas used by the rulers and their government and administration, public places of everyday common life, and the areas of private life. While the structures and concepts of European towns originated from a sociological struggle to gain basic rights of freedom—or town privileges—from political or religious authorities during the Middle Ages, an Islamic town or city is fundamentally influenced by the preservation of the unity of secular and religious life throughout time.

In a medina, palaces and residences as well as public places like mosque-madrasa-hospital complexes and private living spaces rather coexist alongside each other. The buildings tend to be more inwardly oriented, and are separated from the surrounding "outside" either by walls or by the hierarchical ordering of the streets, or both. Streets tend to lead from public main roads to cul-de-sac byroads and onwards into more private plots, and then end there. There are no, or very few, internal connections between different quarters of the city. In order to move from one quarter to the next, one has to go back to the main road again.

Within a city quarter, byroads lead towards individual building complexes or clusters of houses. The individual house is frequently also oriented towards an inner atrium, and enclosed by walls, which mostly are unadorned, unlike European outward-oriented, representative facades. Thus, the spatial structure of a medina essentially reflects the ancient nomadic tradition of living in a family group or tribe, held together by asabiyya, strictly separated from the "outside". In general, the morphology of an Islamic medina is granting—or denying—access according to the basic concept of hierarchical degrees of privacy. The inhabitants move from public space to the living quarters of their tribe, and onwards to their family home. Within a family house, there are again to be found common and separate spaces, the latter, and most private, usually reserved for women and children. In the end, only the family heads have free and unlimited access to all rooms and areas of their private home, as opposed to the more European concept of interconnecting different spaces for free and easy access. The hierarchy of privacy thus guides and structurizes the entire social life in a medina, from the caliph down to his most humble subject, from the town to the house.

Frontier fortresses and towns

Misr, ribat 
In the frontier area of the Arabic expansion, military forts (misr, Pl. , amṣār), or ribāṭ (fortress) were founded. The structure and function of a misr is similar to an ancient Roman Colonia. Like a frontier colony, the fortress served as a base for further conquests. Arabian military forts of this type were frequently built in the vicinity of an older town from Antiquity or from Byzantine times. They frequently were of square format.

Rather than maintaining their original purpose to serve as a military base, many amṣār developed into urbane and administrative centers. In particular, this happened in the case of the Iraqi cities of Kufa and Basra, which became known as al-miṣrān ("the [two] forts"), but also with Fustat and Kairouan in North Africa.

Qaṣr 
Qaṣr (pl. , quṣūr)  means palace, castle or (frontier) fort. Fortresses from Late Antiquity often continued to be in use, while their function changed during time. Some quṣūr were already used as Castra during Roman times, and were part of the fortifications of the North African limes. Already during the Ancient Roman times, castra did not only serve as fortifications, but also as markets and meeting points for the tribes living beyond the border.

After the Limes Arabicus was abandoned by the Roman Empire, many of the castra continued to be in use. This continuity was subject to archaeological investigations in the fort of Qasr al-Hallabat, which at different times served as a Roman castrum, Christian cenobitic monastery, and finally as an Umayyad Qasr. Qasr Al-Kharanah is one of the earliest known Desert castles, its architectural form clearly demonstrates the influence of Sasanian architecture.

According to a hypothesis developed by Jean Sauvaget, the umayyad quṣūr played a role in the systematic agricultural colonisation of the uninhabited frontier areas, and, as such, continue the colonisation strategy of earlier Christian monks and the Ghassanids. The Umayyads, however, increasingly oriented their political strategy towards a model of Client politics, of mutual interdependence and support. After the Umayyad conquest, the quṣūr lost their original function and were either abandoned or continued to serve as local market places and meeting points until the 10th century. Another type of Islamic fortress is the Qalat.

Influences 

Early Islamic architecture was influenced by two different ancient traditions:
 Greco-Roman tradition: In particular, the regions of the newly conquered Byzantine Empire (Southwestern Anatolia, Syria, Egypt and the Maghreb) supplied architects, masons, mosaicists and other craftsmen to the new Islamic rulers. These artisans were trained in Byzantine architecture and decorative arts, and continued building and decorating in Byzantine style, which had developed out of Hellenistic and ancient Roman architecture.
 Eastern tradition: Mesopotamia and Persia, despite adopting elements of Hellenistic and Roman representative style, retained their independent architectural traditions, which derived from Sasanian architecture and its predecessors.

The transition process between late Antiquity, or post-classical, and Islamic architecture is exemplified by archaeologic findings in North Syria and Palestine, the Bilad al-Sham of the Umayyad and Abbasid dynasties. In this region, late antique, or Christian, architectural traditions merged with the pre-Islamic Arabian heritage of the conquerors. Recent research on the history of Islamic art and architecture has revised a number of colonialistic ideas. Specifically, the following questions are currently subject to renewed discussions in the light of recent findings and new concepts of cultural history:
 the existence of a linear development within the Islamic architecture;
 the existence of an inter- and intracultural hierarchy of styles;
 questions of cultural authenticity and its delineation.

Compared to earlier research, the assimilation and transformation of pre-existing architectural traditions is investigated under the aspect of mutual intra- and intercultural exchange of ideas, technologies and styles as well as artists, architects, and materials. In the area of art and architecture, the rise of Islam is seen as a continuous transformation process leading from late Antiquity to the Islamic period. Early research into the area regarded early Islamic architecture merely as a break with the past, from which apparently rose a distorted and less expressive form of art, or a degenerate imitation of the post-classical architectural forms. Modern concepts tend to regard the transition between the cultures rather as a selective process of informed appropriation and transformation. The Umayyads played a crucial role in this process of transforming and thereby enriching the existing architectural traditions, or, in a more general sense, of the visual culture of the nascent Islamic society.

The Dome of the Rock in Jerusalem (691) is one of the most important buildings in all of Islamic architecture. It is patterned after the nearby Church of the Holy Sepulchre and Byzantine Christian artists were employed to create its elaborate mosaics against a golden background. The great epigraphic vine frieze was adapted from the pre-Islamic Syrian style. The Great Mosque of Damascus (completed in 715 by caliph Al-Walid I), built on the site of the basilica of John the Baptist after the Islamic invasion of Damascus, still bore great resemblance to sixth and seventh century Christian basilicas. Certain modifications were implemented, including expanding the structure along the transversal axis which better fit with the Islamic style of prayer.

The Abbasid dynasty (750 AD- 1258) witnessed the movement of the capital from Damascus to Baghdad, and then from Baghdad to Samarra. The shift to Baghdad influenced politics, culture, and art. Abbasid architecture drew more heavily on the architectural traditions of Mesopotomia and Iran, which had been part of the Sassanian Empire. The Great Mosque of Kairouan, in its current form was largely built during the 9th century under the Aghlabids, who ruled on behalf of the Abbasids. Its original marble columns and capitals were of Roman workmanship brought in from Carthage and other elements resemble Roman form.

Influenced by Byzantine and Persian architecture, the pointed arch as an architectonic principle was first clearly established in Islamic architecture and was entirely alien to the pre-Islamic world. Especially in the Persianate world, the slightly "depressed" four-centred arch or "Persian arch", has been the most common style used.

Arabian 
There has been a long-standing belief in western scholarship that the Arabs of the early 7th century, at the time of Muhammad, when were nomadic pastoralists who did not have strong architectural traditions and merely adopted the pre-Islamic styles and ideas of the conquered regions. This view is now generally rejected and considered obsolete by modern scholars. According to scholar Beatrice Saint Laurent, early academic investigations into the history of Islamic monumental architecture led to the "flawed view that saw the roots of an Early Islamic monumental architecture and art solely in the traditions of the conquered regions". Instead, scholars generally agree that a rich architectural tradition preceded the appearance of Islam in Arabia and the first Islamic monuments.

General scholarship holds that pre-Islamic architecture in the Arabian Peninsula had only limited influence on the subsequent development of Islamic architecture, at least by comparison with the influences of existing architectural traditions in the conquered territories beyond the peninsula. The major architectural contribution that took place in Arabia during the early Islamic period was the development of the Muslim mosque. Mosque (Masjid) is a pre-Islamic word attested in inscriptions in pre-Islamic Arabia. The Arab hypostyle mosque constructed by the Prophet Muhammad in Medina served as a model for mosque design throughout the Islamic world. The Umayyad mosque of Damascus reproduced the hypostyle model at a monumental scale. Umayyad religious architecture was the earliest expression of Islamic art on a grand scale. The Arab elite of the early Islam were city dwellers of Mecca, Medina, Ta’if and the highly urbanized society of Yemen whose Arabian traditions contributed to the urban development of the early Islamic cities. Moreover, the Umayyads did not come from a cultural void and were aware of their own Arabian cultural history. Scholars suggest they sought to continue certain pre-Islamic Arabian architectural traditions.

In other regions, the early military encampments of Kufa, Basra, Fustat, Kairouan were rapidly transformed into permanent foundations and planned cities. One of the traditions contributing to the early Islamic city was the south Arabian city such as Sana’a, to which type Mecca and Fustat belonged. Two urban types based on social organization have been proposed. The first is called the San'a-formation, developed from a market center and inhabited by groups of the same tribe with social differentiation based on his "farmer-craftsman" technological specializations. The second urban type is the Tarim-formation, in which quarter organization reflects the social structure of a multi-tribal settlement.

The Arab mosque plan strongly influenced mosque architecture in non-Arab regions as well, especially in the early centuries of Islam. The basic plan and components of the Arab hypostyle mosque plan could be varied at will in order to transform or emphasize certain aspects of the structure, giving the structure a considerable longevity. However, most of the room for innovations within this mosque type had been exhausted by the 10th century. In the architecture of Iran, the hypostyle plan was introduced as the basic mosque layout, brought by the Arabs (the mosques in Siraf, Nayin and Damghan). The early mosques were therefore imported foreign elements that did not have roots in earlier designs. The Arab hypostyle mosque plan also had a strong influence on Chinese mosque architecture, Chinese mosques adopted Arabian architecture absorbed through Chinese classic architecture. The Arab style Qingjing mosque is the oldest of its kind in China and is a UNESCO world Heritage site.

The absence of figurative representation and the tendency towards abstraction and geometrisation is an Arabian concept that forms a foundational aspect in Islam with deep consequences for the development of its artistic and architectural identity.

The word Mihrab comes from Old South Arabian meaning a certain part of a palace, as well as "part of a temple where "a certain type of visions is obtained". The mihrab seems to have maintained its pre-Islamic function as the place of a ruler and may have been added to commemorate the presence of the Prophet as the first imam In the earliest years of Islam.

Regional styles (after the 10th century)

Persian

Under the Seljuqs the "Iranian plan" of mosque construction appears for the first time. Lodging places (khān, or caravanserai) for travellers and their animals, generally displayed utilitarian rather than ornamental architecture, with rubble masonry, strong fortifications, and minimal comfort. Seljuq architecture synthesized various styles, both Iranian and Syrian, sometimes rendering precise attributions difficult. Another important architectural trend to arise in the 10th to 11th centuries is the development of mausolea including the tomb tower such as the Gunbad-i-qabus (circa 1006–7) (showcasing a Zoroastrian motif) and the domed square, an example of which is the tomb of the Samanids in the city of Bukhara (circa 943).

The Il-Khanate period provided several innovations to dome-building that eventually enabled the Persians to construct much taller structures. These changes later paved the way for Safavid architecture. The pinnacle of Il-Khanate architecture was reached with the construction of the Soltaniyeh Dome (1302–1312) in Zanjan, Iran, which measures 50 m in height and 25 m in diameter, making it the 3rd largest and the tallest masonry dome ever erected. The thin, double-shelled dome was reinforced by arches between the layers. The tomb of Öljeitü in Soltaniyeh is one of the greatest and most impressive monuments in Iran, despite many later depredations.Iranian architecture and city planning also reached an apogee under the Timurids, in particular with the monuments of Samarkand, marked by extensive use of exterior ceramic tiles and muqarnas vaulting within. Spectacular and stately edifices erected by Timur and his successors in Samarkand and Herat helped to disseminate the influence of the Ilkhanid school of art in India, thus giving rise to the celebrated Mughal school of architecture. Timurid architecture started with the sanctuary of Ahmed Yasawi in present-day Kazakhstan and culminated in Timur's mausoleum Gur-e Amir in Samarkand. The style is largely derived from Persian architecture. Axial symmetry is a characteristic of all major Timurid structures, notably the Shah-i-Zinda in Samarkand and the mosque of Gawhar Shad in Mashhad. Double domes of various shapes abound, and the outsides are perfused with brilliant colors.

The renaissance in Persian mosque and dome building came during the Safavid dynasty, when Shah Abbas, in 1598 initiated the reconstruction of Isfahan, with the Naqsh-e Jahan Square as the centerpiece of his new capital. The distinct feature of Persian domes, which separates them from those domes created in the Christian world or the Ottoman and Mughal empires, was the colorful tiles, with which they covered the exterior of their domes, as they would on the interior. These domes soon numbered dozens in Isfahan, and the distinct, blue- colored shape would dominate the skyline of the city. Reflecting the light of the sun, these domes appeared like glittering turquoise gem and could be seen from miles away by travelers following the Silk road through Persia. This very distinct style of architecture was inherited to them from the Seljuq dynasty, who for centuries had used it in their mosque building, but it was perfected during the Safavids when they invented the haft- rangi, or seven- colour style of tile burning, a process that enabled them to apply more colours to each tile, creating richer patterns, sweeter to the eye. The colours that the Persians favoured were golden, white and turquoise patterns on a dark- blue background. The extensive inscription bands of calligraphy and arabesque on most of the major buildings where carefully planned and executed by Ali Reza Abbasi, who was appointed head of the royal library and Master calligrapher at the Shah's court in 1598, while Shaykh Bahai oversaw the construction projects. Reaching 53 meters in height, the dome of Masjed-e Shah (Shah Mosque) would become the tallest in the city when it was finished in 1629. It was built as a double- shelled dome, with 14 m spanning between the two layers, and resting on an octagonal dome chamber.

Persian-style mosques are also characterized by their tapered brick pillars, large arcades and arches each supported by several pillars. In South Asia, such art was also used as was a technique throughout the region.

The Islamic conquest of Persia in the seventh century also helped Islamic architecture to flourish in Azerbaijan. The country became home of Nakchivan and Shirvan-Absheron architecture schools. An example of the first direction in the Azerbaijani Islamic architecture is the mausoleum of Yusuf, built in 1162. The Shirvan-Absheron school, unlike Nakchivan style, used stones instead of the bricks in the construction. At the same characteristics of this trend were the asymmetry and stone carving, which includes famous landmarks like Palace of the Shirvanshahs.

Turkish

Great Seljuks and early Turkic dynasties 
Turkic peoples began moving into the Middle East from the 8th century onward and, after converting to Islam, became major political and military forces in the region. The first major Turkic dynasty was the Ghaznavids, who ruled from Ghazna in present-day Afghanistan and adopted a Persianate culture. In the second half of the 12th century the Ghurids, of uncertain ethnic origin, replaced them as the major power in the region from northern India to the edge of the Caspian Sea. Among the most remarkable monuments of these two dynasties are a number of ornate brick towers and minarets which have survived as stand-alone structures. Their whose exact functions are unclear. They include the Tower of Mas'ud III near Ghazna (early 12th century) and the Minaret of Jam built by the Ghurids (late 12th century). Around the same time, between the late 10th century and the early 13th century, the Turkic Qarakhanids ruled in Transoxiana. This period is regarded as a "classical" age of Central Asian architecture, with many impressive constructions taking place in Bukhara and Samarkand. These include a great congregational mosque in Bukhara, of which only the Kalyan Minaret survives (c. 1127), the nearby Minaret of Vabkent (1141), and several Qarakhanid mausoleums with monumental façades, such as those in Uzgen (present-day Kyrgyzstan) from the second half of the 12th century.

More significant was the arrival of the Seljuk Turks and the formation of the Great Seljuk Empire in the 11th century, which conquered all of Iran and other extensive territories in Central Asia and the Middle East. The most important religious monument from the Great Seljuk period is the Jameh Mosque of Isfahan, which was expanded and modified by various Seljuk patrons in the late 11th century and early 12th century. Two major and innovative domed chambers were added to it in the late 11th century. Four large iwans were then erected around the courtyard around the early 12th century, giving rise to the four-iwan plan. The four-iwan plan revolutionised the form and function of the mosques in the region and introduced new types of buildings involving madrasas and caravanserais which spread through Iran, Anatolia, and Syria. Large caravanserais were built as a way to foster trade and assert Seljuk authority in the countryside. They typically consisted of a building with a fortified exterior appearance, monumental entrance portal, and interior courtyard surrounded by various halls, including iwans. Some notable examples, only partly preserved, are the caravanserais of Ribat-i Malik (c. 1068–1080) and Ribat-i Sharaf (12th century) in Transoxiana and Khorasan, respectively. The Seljuks also continued to build "tower tombs", an Iranian building type from earlier periods, such as the Toghrul Tower built in Rayy (south of present-day Tehran) in 1139. More innovative, however, was the introduction of mausoleums with a square or polygonal floor plan, which later became a common form of monumental tombs. Early examples of this are the two Kharraqan Mausoleums (1068 and 1093) near Qazvin (northern Iran), which have octagonal forms, and the large Mausoleum of Sanjar (c. 1152) in Merv (present-day Turkmenistan), which has a square base.

After the decline of the Great Seljuks in the late 12th century various Turkic dynasties formed smaller states and empires. A branch of the Seljuk dynasty ruled a Sultanate in Anatolia (also known as the Anatolian Seljuks), the Zengids and Artuqids ruled in Northern Mesopotomia (known as the Jazira) and nearby regions, and the Khwarazmian Empire ruled over Iran and Central Asia until the Mongol invasions of the 13th century. Under Zengid and Artuqid rule cities like Mosul, Diyarbakir, Hasankeyf, and Mardin became important centers of architectural development that had a long-term influence in the wider regions of Anatolia and Syria. One of the most notable monuments in the region is the Great Mosque of Diyarbakir, founded in the 7th century but rebuilt by the Artuqids in the 12th century. It is similar in form to the Umayyad Mosque of Damascus and has ornate Classical-like elements on its courtyard façade. The city walls of Diyarbakir also feature several towers built by the Artuqids and decorated with a mix of calligraphic inscriptions and figurative images of animals and mythological creatures carved in stone. One of the culminations of later Artuqid architecture is the Zinciriye or Sultan Isa Madrasa in Mardin, dating from 1385. In Mosul, the Zengid ruler Nur al-Din built the al-Nuri Mosque (1148 and 1170–1172), of which only the original minaret was preserved up to modern times. (The minaret and the rebuilt mosque were recently destroyed in the Battle of Mosul.) Damascus regained some prominence after it came under Nur al-Din's control in 1154. That same year, Nur al-Din founded a hospital complex, the Maristan al-Nuri or Bimaristan of Nur al-Din, which was highly influential in the Islamic world and is notable for the muqarnas vaulting of its entrance portal and a muqarnas dome of Mesopotamian influence over the vestibule. The Zengids and their successors, the Kurdish Ayyubid dynasty, built many more madrasas, fortifications, hammams, and other charitable buildings in the cities of Syria. Unlike Seljuk and Iranian madrasas, the Syrian madrasas were smaller and more diverse in their layouts, adapted to the dense urban fabric of cities like Damascus and Aleppo. In Central Asia, the former Khwarazmian capital, Kunya-Urgench (present-day Turkmenistan), has preserved several structures from the Khwarazmian Empire period (late 12th and early 13th century), including the so-called Mausoleum of Fakhr al-Din Razi (possibly the tomb of Il-Arslan) and the Mausoleum of Sultan Tekesh.

Anatolian Seljuks and Beyliks 

The Anatolian Seljuks ruled a territory that was multi-ethnic and only newly settled by Muslims. As a result, their architecture was eclectic and incorporated influences from other cultures such as Iranian, Armenian, and local Byzantine architecture.In contrast with Seljuk constructions further east, Anatolian architecture was made of stone and more of their monuments were preserved up to modern times. The golden age of their Anatolian empire, with its capital at Konya, was in the early 13th century. Seljuk authority declined after their defeat at the hands of the Mongols in the Battle of Köse Dağ in 1243. In eastern Anatolia the Mongol Ilkhanids ruled indirectly through Seljuk vassals at first and before taking direct control after 1308. Smaller principalities and emirates emerged locally, known collectively as the Beyliks. Despite this decline, the Seljuk tradition of architecture largely persisted and continued to evolve under these new rulers.

The four-iwan plan, developed under the earlier Seljuks in Iran, did not appear in Anatolian Seljuk mosques. The congregational mosques of Anatolian Seljuks included more conservative hypostyle constructions alongside less traditional floor plans. Major hypostyle examples include the Great Mosque of Sivas (1197) and the Alaeddin Mosque of Konya (built over multiple periods between 1156 and 1235, with later additions). The "wooden" mosque, a variation of the hypostyle mosque with wooden columns and ceilings, emerged in western central Anatolia in the 13th century. The earliest example is the Great Mosque of Sivrihisar (1232) and the most accomplished example is the Eşrefoğlu Mosque (1297) in Beyşehir. Mosques in the later Beylik period were more diverse, including the Saruhanid congregational mosque in Manisa (1371), the Isa Bey Mosque in Selçuk (1374), and the İlyas Bey Mosque in Miletus (1304).

Numerous madrasas were built. Architecturally, they consisted mainly of two types. One type, similar to those of Iran and Mesopotamia, was centered around an open courtyard which was bordered by a varying number of iwans (with at least one iwan situated along the axis of the entrance). In these madrasas the decoration was concentrated around a monumental entrance portal. The Çifte Minareli Medrese (c. 1250 or 1253) in Erzurum is one of the earliest examples of an entrance portal surmounted by twin minarets. The Gök Medrese (1271–1272) in Sivas is another rich monument in a similar form. The second type of madrasa, which was particular to Anatolia, was a smaller madrasa with a central court covered by a dome. These were especially characteristic of Konya, exemplified by the Karatay Medrese (1251–1252) and Ince Minareli Medrese (c. 1265).

Some of the most impressive Seljuk monuments were caravanserais built along many trade routes between cities. Hundreds of them were built in the 13th century. The major examples of this type, such as the Sultan Han on the Konya–Aksaray road (1229) and the Sultan Han on the Kayseri–Sivas road (1236–1237), have a monumental but fortified exterior appearance with an entrance portal of decorated carved stone leading to an open-air interior courtyard. In the center of these courtyards there is sometimes a small cubic prayer room raised above the ground on four pillars. On the opposite side of the entrance another portal led to a covered hall with many aisles running perpendicular to a central aisle with a central dome.

Decoration in Anatolian Seljuk architecture was concentrated on certain elements like entrance portals, windows, and the mihrabs of mosques. Stone-carving was one of the most accomplished mediums of decoration, with motifs ranging from earlier Iranian stucco motifs to local Byzantine and Armenian motifs. The madrasas of Sivas and the Ince Minareli Medrese in Konya among the most notable examples, while the Great Mosque and Hospital complex of Divriği is distinguished by some of the most eclectic and extravagant stone-carving in the region. Syrian-style ablaq striped marble also appears on the entrance portal of the Karatay Medrese and the Alaeddin Mosque in Konya. Although tilework was commonly used in Iran, Anatolian architecture innovated in the use of tile revetments to cover entire surfaces independently of other forms of decoration. This is seen in the Karatay Medrese and also evidenced by the mosaic tiles recovered from the remains of the Kubadabad Palace (c. 1236 or early 13th century).

Ottoman 

The architecture of the Ottoman Empire developed from earlier Seljuk architecture, with influences from Byzantine and Iranian architecture along with architectural traditions of the Balkans and other parts of Middle East. The classical architecture of the Ottoman Empire was a mixture of native Turkish tradition and influences from Hagia Sophia. One of the best representatives of this period is Mimar Sinan, whose works include the Süleymaniye Mosque in Istanbul and the Selimiye Mosque in Edirne.

Beginning in the 18th century, Ottoman architecture was influenced by the Baroque architecture in Western Europe. Nuruosmaniye Mosque is one of the surviving examples from this period. The last Ottoman period saw more influences from Western Europe, brought in by architects such those from the Balyan family. This period also saw the development of a new architectural style called neo-Ottoman or Ottoman revivalism, also known as the First National Architectural Movement, by architects such as Mimar Kemaleddin and Vedat Tek.

While Istanbul was the main site of imperial patronage for most of the empire's history, the early capitals of Bursa and Edirne also contain a concentration of Ottoman monuments. Ottoman architecture is also found across the empire's provinces, ranging from Eastern Europe to the Middle East to North Africa. Major religious monuments, such as those sponsored by sultan and his family, were typically architectural complexes, known as a külliye, which had multiple elements providing various charitable services. These complexes were governed and managed with the help of a vakif agreement (Arabic waqf). For example, the Fatih Mosque in Istanbul was part of a very large külliye founded by Mehmed II, built between 1463 and 1470, which also included: a tabhane (guesthouse for travelers), an imaret (charitable kitchen), a darüşşifa (hospital), a caravanserai, a mektep (primary school), a library, a hammam (bathhouse), a cemetery with the founder's mausoleum, and eight madrasas along with their annexes. The buildings were arranged in a regular, partly symmetrical layout with the monumental mosque at its center, although not all the structures have survived to the present day.

Iberian Peninsula and western North Africa 

The architectural style which developed in the westernmost territories of the historic Muslim world is often referred to as "Moorish architecture". The term "Moorish" comes from the European designation of the Muslim inhabitants of these regions as "Moors". Scholars sometimes use "Western Islamic architecture" or "architecture of the Islamic west" as a more precise term for this subject. This architectural style developed primarily in Al-Andalus (present-day Spain between 711 and 1492 and Portugal between 711 and 1249) and in western North Africa including Morocco, Algeria, and Tunisia (part of the Maghreb). It blended influences from Berber (Amazigh) culture in North Africa, pre-Islamic Spain (Roman, Byzantine, and Visigothic), and contemporary artistic currents in the Islamic Middle East to elaborate a unique style over centuries with recognizable features such as the "Moorish" arch, riad gardens (symmetrically divided courtyard gardens), and elaborate geometric and arabesque motifs in wood, stucco, and tilework (notably zellij). Major centers of this artistic development included the main capitals of the empires and Muslim states in the region's history, such as Cordoba, Kairouan, Fes, Marrakesh, Seville, Granada and Tlemcen. Among the best-known monuments from these areas are the Great Mosque of Cordoba, the palace-city of Madinat al-Zahra (near Cordoba), the Qarawiyyin Mosque (in Fes), the Great Mosque of Tlemcen, the Kutubiyya Mosque (Marrakesh), the Giralda tower (Seville), and the fortified palace-complex of the Alhambra (Granada).

Even after the Christian conquests of Al-Andalus the legacy of Moorish architecture was still carried on in the Mudéjar style in Spain, which made use of Moorish techniques and designs and adapted them to Christian patrons. In North Africa, the medieval Moorish style was perpetuated in Moroccan architecture with relatively few changes, while in Algeria and Tunisia it became blended with Ottoman architecture after the Ottoman conquest of the region in the 16th century. Much later, particularly in the 19th century, the Moorish style was frequently imitated or emulated in the Neo-Moorish or Moorish Revival style which emerged in Europe and America as part of the Romanticist interest in the "Orient" and also, notably, as a recurring choice for new Jewish Synagogue architecture.

In addition to the general Moorish style, some styles and structures in North Africa are distinctively associated with areas that have maintained strong Berber populations and cultures, including but not limited to the Atlas Mountain regions of Morocco, the Aurès and M'zab regions of Algeria, and southern Tunisia. They do not form one single style but rather a diverse variety of local vernacular styles. Berber ruling dynasties also contributed to the formation and patronage of western Islamic art and architecture through their political domination of the region between the 11th and 16th centuries (during the rule of the Almoravids, Almohads, Marinids and Hafsids, among others). In Morocco, the largely Berber-inhabited rural valleys and oases of the Atlas and the south are marked by numerous kasbahs (fortresses) and ksour (fortified villages), typically flat-roofed structures made of rammed earth and decorated with local geometric motifs, as with the famous example of Ait Benhaddou. Likewise, southern Tunisia is dotted with hilltop ksour and multi-story fortified granaries (ghorfa), such as the examples in Medenine and Ksar Ouled Soltane, typically built with loose stone bound by a mortar of clay. The island of Jerba in Tunisia has a traditional mosque architecture featuring low-lying structures built in stone and covered in whitewash. Their prayer halls are domed and they have short, round minarets. The M'zab region of Algeria (e.g. Ghardaïa) also has distinctive mosques and houses that are completely whitewashed, but built in rammed earth. Its structures also make frequent use of domes and barrel vaults. Unlike Jerba, the distinctive minarets here are tall and have a square base, tapering towards the end and crowned with "horn"-like corners.

Mamluk 

The Mamluks were a military corps recruited from slaves that served under the Ayyubid dynasty and eventually took over from that dynasty in 1250, ruling over Egypt, the Levant, and the Hijaz until the Ottoman conquest of 1517. Despite their often tumultuous and violent internal politics, the Mamluk sultans were prolific patrons of architecture and contributed enormously to the repertoire of monuments in historic Cairo, their capital. Some long-reigning sultans, such as Al-Nasir Muhammad (reigning between 1293 and 1341with interruptions) and Qaytbay (r. 1468–1496), were especially prolific. While Cairo was the main center of patronage, Mamluk architecture also appears in other cities of their realm such as Damascus, Jerusalem, Aleppo, and Medina.

Mamluk architecture is distinguished in part by the construction of multi-functional buildings whose floor plans became increasingly creative and complex due to the limited available space in the city and the desire to make monuments visually dominant in their urban surroundings. Patrons, including sultans and high-ranking emirs, typically set out to build mausoleums for themselves but attached to them various charitable structures such as madrasas, khanqahs, sabils, or mosques. The revenues and expenses of these charitable complexes were governed by inalienable waqf agreements that also served the secondary purpose of ensuring some form of income or property for the patrons' descendants. The cruciform or four-iwan floor plan was adopted for madrasas and became more common for new monumental complexes than the traditional hypostyle mosque, although the vaulted iwans of the early period were replaced with flat-roofed iwans in the later period. The decoration of monuments also became more elaborate over time, with stone-carving and colored marble paneling and mosaics (including ablaq) replacing stucco as the most dominant architectural decoration. Monumental decorated entrance portals became common compared to earlier periods, often carved with muqarnas. Influences from the Syrian region, Ilkhanid Iran, and possibly even Venice were evident in these trends. Minarets, which were also elaborate, usually consisted of three tiers separated by balconies, with each tier having a different design than the others. Late mamluk minarets, for example, most typically had an octagonal shaft for the first tier, a round shaft on the second, and a lantern structure with finial on the third level. Domes also transitioned from wooden or brick structures, sometimes of bulbous shape, to pointed stone domes with complex geometric or arabesque motifs carved into their outer surfaces. The peak of this stone dome architecture was achieved under the reign of Qaytbay in the late 15th century.

After the Ottoman conquest of 1517, new Ottoman-style buildings were introduced, however the Mamluk style continued to be repeated or combined with Ottoman elements in many subsequent monuments. Some building types from the late Mamluk period, such as sabil-kuttabs (a combination of sabil and kuttab) and multi-storied caravanserais (wikalas or khans), actually grew in number during the Ottoman period. In modern times, from the late 19th century onwards, a "neo-Mamluk" style was also used, partly as a nationalist response against Ottoman and European styles, in an effort to promote local "Egyptian" styles (though the architects were sometimes Europeans). Examples of this style are the Museum of Islamic Arts in Cairo, the Al-Rifa'i Mosque, the Abu al-Abbas al-Mursi Mosque in Alexandria, and numerous private and public buildings such as those of Heliopolis.

Yemeni 

Yemeni Architecture can be characterized as "conservative", as the Yemeni people combine their pre-Islamic and Islamic past. This philosophy is demonstrated in the construction of the mosque of Solomon in Marib, which was built directly on top of an old temple. In Antiquity, Yemen was home to several wealthy city-states and an indigenous tradition of South Arabian architecture. Historical texts and archeological evidence indicate that large and richly-decorated palaces existed in several cities, such as the Ghumdan Palace in Sanaa. Most of these structures have not been preserved, although the remains of Shabwa, the former capital of Ḥaḍramawt, provide some evidence of their structure. By the 5th century AD, there is evidence that the indigenous styles were being influenced by Byzantine and Late Antique Mediterranean art. In the 5th and 6th centuries Christianity spread in the region and churches were built. Abraha, a local Aksumite ruler, built a cathedral in Sanaa circa 567, allegedly with the help of two architects provided by Byzantine emperor Justinian I.

Yemen was Islamized in the 7th century, but few buildings from the early Islamic period have been preserved intact today. It is only from the 10th century onward that distinctive Islamic architectural styles can be documented. After the early caliphal period the region was ruled by various dynasties including the Sulayhids (11th–12th centuries) and Rasulids (13th–15th centuries), among other local states. One type of mosque attested around this time consists of a large cubic chamber with one entrance, which had antecedents in the pre-Islamic temple architecture of the region. Examples include the al-Abbas Mosque in Asnaf (1126, near Sanaa) and the Mosque of Sarha (13th century, near Ibb), which both have richly-decorated ceilings carved and painted with interlacing star-like patterns. Another type consisted of a rectangular chamber, with a transverse orientation, with multiple entrances and supporting columns inside, sometimes preceded by a courtyard. Examples of this include the Mosque of Sulayman ibn Dawud (1089) at Ma'rib and the congregational mosque of Damar (12th–13th century). This type also had pre-Islamic antecedents.

The hypostyle mosque with courtyard, which was more common throughout much of the Islamic world at the time, was comparatively rare in early Islamic Yemen. The Great Mosque of Sanaa, commissioned by the Umayyad caliph al-Walid  (r. 705–15), was one of the few mosques of this type in the region. It was reconstructed in 753–4 and again after 875. On the latter occasion it was rebuilt with stone and gypsum walls and a teak roof, though these too have been repaired and restored over the centuries. The mosque's decoration reflects the multiple restorations but also exemplifies the best artistic techniques in Yemen over the centuries, including carved and painted wood, carved stone, and carved stucco. Another example of an early hypostyle courtyard mosque in the region is the Great Mosque of Shibam (9th–10th century) and the Mosque of Arwa bint Ahmad (1087–9) in Jibla. The Great Mosque of Shibam, like the Great Mosque of Sanaa, has a richly-painted ceiling, though its columns and their capitals resemble pre-Islamic forms. The Mosque of Arwa bint Ahmad was reportedly part of a Sulayhid palace before being converted to a mosque. Unlike other local hypostyle mosques at the time, it features a dome over the space in front of its mihrab, which is likely due to Fatimid architectural influence via the Sulayhids (who acknowledged the Fatimids as caliphs). Its mihrab is also the oldest surviving well-decorated mihrab in Yemen, covered in carved arabesques and featuring a rectangular frame with a Kufic inscription. This design was imitated in later mihrabs in the region. One of the oldest surviving minarets in Yemen is the brick minaret of the Great Mosque of Zabid.

The Ayyubids introduced domed mosque types as well as Sunni-syle madrasas to the region, but none of their buildings in Yemen have survived. The Rasulids after them, however, were prolific patrons of architecture and perpetuated these new building types, influenced by their political links with Egypt. The Rasulids were based in Ta'izz and several of their buildings survive there, including the Muẓaffariyya Mosque (built by Sultan al-Malik al-Muẓaffar Yusuf sometime between 1249 and 1295) and the Ashrafiyya Mosque (built by Sultan al-Malik al-Ashraf in 1397–1401), both of which feature large central domes flanked by smaller domes. The oldest madrasas in Yemen also date from this time, including three in Ta'izz: the Asadiyya Madrasa (before 1258), the Mu'tabiyya Madrasa (1392) and the Ashrafiyya Madrasa (attached to the mosque of the same name). Unlike contemporary madrasas in Egypt, the Rasulid madrasas do not follow the four-iwan layout. The Mu'tabiyya and Ashrafiyya madrasas both have rectangular floor plans with a domed prayer hall to the north and a courtyard to the south flanked by smaller domed and vaulted chambers on either side which were used for teaching.

During the same period, the Zaydi imams in northern Yemen were buried in richly-decorated domed tombs which were among the only significant examples of this type of building in Yemen at the time, as the Rasulid rulers were normally buried in tombs attached to their madrasas. Minarets in the later Rasulid period were strongly influenced by Egyptian Mamluk minarets, with shafts divided into multiple levels with differing designs, while Zaydi minarets were generally simpler. With the advent of Ottoman rule in Yemen after 1538, Rasulid-style architecture continued to be the local norm in Sunni-controlled areas, but elements of Ottoman architecture began to be introduced in the late 16th century with the construction of new monuments such as the Bakiriyya Mosque in Sanaa in 1597.

Yemen is also notable for its historic tower-houses, built on two or more floors. These houses vary in form and materials from region to region. They are typically built of mud (either rammed earth or sun-dried mud-brick), stone, or a combination of both, with timber used for roofs and floors. In some cases, as at Sanaa, the lower floors are built in heavier stone and the upper floors are built in lighter brick. Mud is sometimes mixed with straw and the walls are sometimes finished with lime. Traditionally, the ground floor could be used for practical functions such as agriculture, the middle floors consisted of various multi-functional rooms, and the top floor often had a large reception room (mafraj) which also enjoyed the best views. Some villages and towns, such as Rada'a, were built around a fortified citadel (e.g. the Citadel of Rada'a), others were encircled by a high mud-brick wall (e.g. Shibam), and some were built so that the houses themselves formed an outer wall along an elevated position (e.g. Khawlan). While these structures are repaired and restored over time, this architectural style has remained generally unchanged for hundreds of years. The old city of Sanaa is a prominent example which preserves many of these houses. Today it is a UNESCO World Heritage Site, although its conservation is threatened by the ongoing Yemeni Civil War.

Indian subcontinent 

Indo-Islamic architecture on the Indian subcontinent began in Sindh in the 8th century, where remains of a congregational mosque at Banbhore dating to 725 have been uncovered. The Ghurids laid the foundations of the Delhi Sultanate and built monuments in northern India in the 12th and 13th centuries. The most notable monument of this period is the Quwwat al-Islam Mosque complex and the Qutb Minar, which were begun in the 1190s by Sultan Qutb al-Din Aybak. The mosque's initial construction reused spolia from Hindu and Jain temples and the complex became a prototype for many mosques built in the region afterwards. The progress of Islamization in the region during the 14th and 15th centuries resulted in the emergence of a more distinctive Indo-Islamic style around this time, as exemplified by the monuments built under the Tughluq dynasty and other local states. Among other features, this style made increased use of arches, vaulted spaces, domes, and water features, while also integrating them with indigenous Indian architectural elements. In the northwestern part of the subcontinent, some notable examples from this period include the Tomb of Rukn-i Alam in Multan and the congregational mosque of Ahmedabad (1423), the latter of which is a particularly harmonious example of Islamic and indigenous Indian elements combined in one building.

The best known style of Indo-Islamic architecture is Mughal architecture, mostly built between about 1560 and 1720. Early Mughal architecture developed from existing Indo-Islamic architecture but also followed the model of Timurid architecture, due in part to the Timurid ancestry of the Mughal dynasty's founder, Babur. Mughal architecture's most prominent examples are the series of imperial mausolea, which started with the pivotal Tomb of Humayun. The most famous is the Taj Mahal in Agra, completed in 1648 by emperor Shah Jahan in memory of his wife Mumtaz Mahal who died while giving birth to their 14th child. The Taj Mahal is completely symmetrical except for Shah Jahan's sarcophagus, which is placed off center in the crypt room below the main floor. This symmetry extended to the building of an entire mirror mosque in black marble to complement the Mecca-facing mosque placed to the west of the main structure. Another slightly later imperial mausoleum is the Bibi Ka Maqbara in Aurangabad (1678) which was commissioned by the sixth Mughal emperor, Aurangzeb, in memory of his wife.

The Mughals also built monumental palaces and mosques. A famous example of the charbagh style of Mughal garden is the Shalimar Gardens in Lahore, where the domeless Tomb of Jahangir is also located. The Red Fort in Delhi and the Agra Fort are huge castle-like fortified palaces, and the abandoned city of Fatehpur Sikri, 26 miles (42 km) west of Agra, was built for Akbar in the late 16th century. Major mosques built by Mughal emperors and their family include the Jama Masjid (Friday Mosque) in Delhi, the Badshahi Mosque in Lahore, and other mosques of similar form which were often built near or within other imperial complexes. Even the Mughal nobility were able to build relatively major monuments, as with the example of the Wazir Khan Mosque in Lahore (1635), built by Wazir Khan when he was governor of the Punjab under Shah Jahan. In the later Mughal period some local governors became semi-autonomous, prompting them to build their own monuments and embellish their own regional capitals with highly-creative local styles of architecture. The Bara Imambara complex built by Asaf al-Dawla in Lucknow is an example of this.

The Deccan sultanates in the southern regions of the Indian subcontinent also developed their local Indo-Islamic Deccani architectural styles, exemplified by monuments such as the Charminar in Hyderabad (1591) and Gol Gumbaz in Bijapur (1656). In the eastern part of the Indian subcontinent, the Bengali region developed a distinct regional style under the independent Bengal Sultanate, which flourished between the 14th and 16th centuries. It incorporated influences from Persia, Byzantium and North India, which were with blended indigenous Bengali elements, such as curved roofs, corner towers and complex terracotta ornamentation. One feature in the sultanate was the relative absence of minarets. Many small and medium-sized medieval mosques, with multiple domes and artistic niche mihrabs, were constructed throughout the region. The grand mosque of Bengal was the Adina Mosque (1374–75), the largest mosque in the Indian subcontinent, though partially ruined today. Built of stone demolished from temples, it featured a monumental ribbed barrel vault over the central nave, the first such giant vault used anywhere in the subcontinent. The mosque was modeled on the imperial Sasanian style of Persia. Another exceptional example which survives in present-day Bangladesh is the Sat Gumbaz ("Sixty-Dome") Mosque in Bagerhat. Later, a provincial style influenced by North India evolved in Mughal Bengal during the 17th and 18th centuries. The Mughals also copied the Bengali do-chala roof tradition for mausoleums in North India.

Malay-Indonesian 

Islam spread gradually in the Malay-Indonesia archipelago from the 12th century onwards, and especially during the 15th century as the Sultanate of Malacca dominated the region. The introduction of Islam was slow and gradual. The advent of Islam did not lead to the introduction of a new building tradition but saw the appropriation of existing architectural forms, which were reinterpreted to suit Muslim requirements. Existing architectural features in Malay-Indonesia such as the candi bentar gate, paduraksa (normally marks the entrance to the most sacred precincts), balai nobat (a tower supposedly used to store royal musical instruments) and the sacred pyramidal roof was used for Islamic architecture. For centuries, Malay-Indonesian mosques lacked domes or minarets, both considered of Middle Eastern origin. Malay-Indonesian original mosques feature multi-layered pyramidal roofs and no minaret. Prayer is called by striking a prayer's drum known as beduk. The minaret of the Menara Kudus Mosque is a great example of Malay-Indonesian architecture. Malay-Indonesian mosque architecture also features strong influence from the Middle Eastern architecture styles. This style of architecture can be found on the design of mosques in Brunei, Indonesia, Malaysia, Singapore, the Philippines and Thailand. Today, with increasing Muslim pilgrimage to Mecca, Malay-Indonesian mosques are developing a more standard, international style, with a dome and minaret.

Indonesia 

The oldest surviving mosque in Indonesia is the Great Mosque of Demak which is the royal mosque of the Sultanate of Demak, although this is not the oldest Islamic structure. The oldest Islamic structure in Indonesia are parts of the royal palace in Sultanate of Cirebon, Cirebon. The palace complex contains a chronogram which can be read as the Saka equivalent of 1454 CE. Early Islamic palaces retain many features of pre-Islamic architecture which is apparent in the gates or drum towers. The Kasepuhan Palace was probably begun in the late pre-Islamic period and continued to grow during the Hinduism-to-Islam transitional period. The complex contains clues to the stages of the process of the gradual changes as Islam become incorporated into Indonesian architecture. Two of the Hindu features adopted into Islam in the palace is the two types of gateways - the split portal (candi bentar) which provides access to the public audience pavilion and the lintel gate (paduraksa) which leads to the frontcourt.

Malaysia 
The original mosque in Malaysia had a basic architectural style and structure: with four pillars for the foundation and palm fronds for the roof. In Malacca, the architectural design is a cross between local Malay, Indian and Chinese architecture. Traditionally, the minaret resembles a pagoda with the style of "Balai Nobat". An ancient cemetery also usually lies next to the mosque is where some notable preachers and missionaries are buried.

Chinese 

The first Chinese mosque was established in the seventh century during the Tang dynasty in Xi'an. The Great Mosque of Xi'an, whose current buildings date from the Ming dynasty, does not replicate many of the features often associated with traditional mosques. Instead, it follows traditional Chinese architecture. Some Chinese mosques in parts of western China were more likely to incorporate minarets and domes while eastern Chinese mosques were more likely to look like pagodas.

As in other regions, Chinese Islamic architecture reflects the local architecture in its style; some Chinese mosques resemble temples. In western China, mosques resemble those of the Arab World, with tall, slender minarets, curvy arches and dome shaped roofs. In northwest China where the Chinese Hui have built their mosques, there is a combination of eastern and western styles. The mosques have flared Buddhist style roofs set in walled courtyards entered through archways with miniature domes and minarets.

Volga Tatar 

Tatar architecture has evolved through the periods of the Golden Horde, the Tatar khanates and under the rule of the Russian Empire. Many traditional Tatar mosques built by the Volga Tatars have a gabled roof and a minaret placed in the center of the mosque, above the roof, rather than at the side or corner of the building. Examples of such mosques survive from the 18th and 19th centuries and were restored in modern times. This style is also found among the wooden mosques of the Lithuanian Tatars, whose mosque architecture was influenced by the Kazan (Volga) Tatars. Another type of mosque, with a domed roof and a minaret standing above the entrance, appeared in the mid-19th century.

Sahel and West Africa 

In West Africa, Muslim merchants played a vital role in the western Sahel region since the 9th century through trans-Saharan trade networks. While the Islamic architecture of this region shares a certain style, a wide variety of materials and local styles are evident across this wide geographic range. A variety of possible influences on this architecture have been suggested. North African and Andalusi architecture to the north may have been one of these, with the existence of square minarets possibly reflecting the influence of the Great Mosque of Kairouan. More local or indigenous pagan cultures may have also been an influence in the later Islamic architecture of the region. In the more arid western Sahara and northern Sahel regions, stone predominates as a building material and is often associated with Berber cultures. In the southern Sahel and savannah regions mud-brick and rammed earth are the main material and is now associated with the most monumental examples of West African Islamic architecture. In some places, like Timbuktu and Oualata, both building materials are used together, with stone constructions either covered or bound with a mud plaster.

The earliest mosques discovered in sub-Saharan Africa are at Kumbi Saleh (in present-day southern Mauritania), the former capital of the Ghana Empire. Here, a mosque has been discovered which consisted of a courtyard, a prayer hall, and a square minaret, built in dry stone covered in red mud used as plaster. On both the exterior and interior of the mosque, this plaster was painted with floral, geometric, and epigraphic motifs. A similar stone mosque from the same period has been found at Awdaghust. Both mosques are dated generally between the 9th and 14th centuries. The mosque of Kumbi Saleh appears to have gone through multiple construction phases from the 10th century to the early 14th century. At Kumbi Saleh, locals lived in domed-shaped dwellings in the king's section of the city, surrounded by a great enclosure. Traders lived in stone houses in a section which possessed 12 beautiful mosques (as described by Al-Bakri), one centered on Friday prayer. The king is said to have owned several mansions, one of which was 66 feet long, 42 feet wide, contained seven rooms, was two stories high, and had a staircase; with the walls and chambers filled with sculpture and painting.

As Islamization progressed across the region, more variations developed in mosque architecture, including the adoption of traditional local forms not previously associated with Islamic architecture. Under Songhai influence, minarets took on a more pyramidal appearance and became stepped or tiered on three levels, as exemplified by the tower of the mosque–tomb of Askia al-Hajj Muhammad in Gao (present-day Mali). In Timbuktu, the Sankoré Mosque (established in the 14th-15th centuries and rebuilt in the 16th century, with later additions), had a tapering minaret and a prayer hall with rows of arches. The presence of tapering minarets may also reflect cultural contacts with M'zab region to the north, while decoration found at Timbuktu may reflect contacts with Berber communities in what is now Mauritania. In the earthen (mud) architecture of the region, Andrew Petersen distinguishes two main styles: a "western" style that may have its roots in Djenné (present-day Mali), and an "eastern" style associated with Hausa architecture that may have its roots in Kano (present-day Nigeria). The eastern or Hausa style is generally more plain on the exterior of buildings, but is characterized by diverse interior decoration and the much greater use of wood. Mosques often have prayer halls with pillars supporting flat or slightly domed roofs of wood and mud. An exceptional example is the 19th-century Great Mosque of Zaria (present-day Nigeria), which has parabolic arches and a roof of shallow domes. The western or "Sudan" style is characterized by more elaborate and decorated exterior façades whose compositions emphasize verticality. They have tapering buttresses with cone-shaped summits, mosques have a large tower over the mihrab, and wooden stakes (toron) are often embedded in the walls – used for scaffolding but possibly also for some symbolic purpose. 

More hybrid styles also arose further south and on the edge of Islamized areas. In the Fouta Djallon region, in the Guinea Highlands, mosques were built with a traditional rectangular or square layout, but then covered by a huge conical thatched roof which protects from the rain. This type of roof was an existing feature of the traditional circular huts inhabited by the locals, re-adapted to cover new rectangular mosques when the mostly Muslim Fula people settled the region in the 18th century. A good example is the Friday mosque of Dinguiraye in Guinea, built in 1850 (with later restorations). Many others are attested in the same region overlapping with southern Senegal, western Mali, and Burkina Faso.

During the French colonial occupation of the Sahel, French engineers and architects had a role in popularizing a "Neo-Sudanese" style based on local traditional architecture but emphasizing symmetry and monumentality. The Great Mosque of Djenné, which was previously established in the 14th century but demolished in the early 19th century, was rebuilt in 1906–1907 under the direction of Ismaila Traoré and with guidance from French engineers. Now the largest earthen building in sub-Saharan Africa, it served as a model for the new style and for other mosques in the region, including the Grand Mosque of Mopti built by the French administration in 1935. Other 20th-century and more recent mosques in West Africa have tended to replicate a more generic style similar to that of modern Egypt.

Somali 

The spread of Islam in the early medieval era of Somalia's history brought Islamic architectural influences from Arabia and Persia, which stimulated a shift from drystone and other related materials in construction to coral stone, sundried bricks, and the widespread use of limestone in Somali architecture. Many of the new architectural designs such as mosques were built on the ruins of older structures, a practice that would continue over and over again throughout the following centuries. Concordant with the ancient presence of Islam in the Horn of Africa region, mosques in Somalia are some of the oldest on the entire continent. One architectural feature that made Somali mosques distinct from other mosques in Africa were minarets.

For centuries, Arba Rukun (1269), the Friday mosque of Merca (1609) and Fakr ad-Din (1269) were, in fact, the only mosques in East Africa to have minarets. Fakr ad-Din, which dates back to the Mogadishan Golden Age, was built with marble and coral stone and included a compact rectangular plan with a domed mihrab axis. Glazed tiles were also used in the decoration of the mihrab, one of which bears a dated inscription. The 13th century Al Gami University consisted of a rectangular base with a large cylindrical tower architecturally unique in the Islamic world.

Shrines to honor Somali patriarchs and matriarchs evolved from ancient Somali burial customs. In Southern Somalia the preferred medieval shrine architecture was the Pillar tomb style while the North predominantly built structures consisting of domes and square plans.

In modern times 

In modern times, the architecture of Islamic buildings, not just religious ones, has gone through some changes. The new architectural style doesn't stick with the same fundamental aspects that were seen in the past, but mosques for the most part still feature the same parts—the miḥrāb, the minarets, four-iwan plan, and the pishtaq. A difference to note is the appearance of mosques without domes, as in the past mosques for the most part all had them, but these new dome-less mosques seem to follow a function over form design, and are created by those not of the Islamic faith, in most cases. The influence of Islam still pervades the style of creation itself, and provides a 'conceptual framework', for the making of a building that exemplifies the styles and beliefs of Islam. It has also been influenced by the now meeting of many different cultures, such as European styles meeting Islamic styles, leading to Islamic architects incorporating features of other architectural and cultural styles.

Urban design and Islam 
Urban design and the tradition of Islamic styled architecture have begun to combine to form a new 'neo-Islamic' style, where the efficiency of the urban style meshes with the spirituality and aesthetic characteristics of Islamic styles. Islamic Architecture in itself is a style that showcases the values, and the culture of Islam, but in modern times sticking to tradition is falling out of practice, so a combination style formed. Examples showing this are places such as the Marrakesh Menara Airport, the Islamic Cultural Center and Museum of Tolerance, Masjid Permata Qolbu, the concept for The Vanishing Mosque, and the Mazar-e-Quaid. All of these buildings show the influence of Islam over them, but also the movements of things like minimalism which are rising to popularity in the architectural field. Designers that use the aspects of both modern styles and the Islamic styles found a way to have the Western-inspired modernism with the classical cultural aspects of Islamic architecture. This concept though brings up the controversy of the identity of the Islamic community, of the traditional Islamic community, within a space that doesn't follow the way they knew it.

Debates on status as a style of architecture 
There are some who also debate whether Islamic Architecture can truly be called a style, as the religious aspect is seen as separate and having no bearing on the architectural style, while on the other side people also argue that the newfound trend and divergence from the style of old Islamic Architecture is what is causing the style to lose its status. There are scholars that also believe that the distinguishing features of the Islamic Architecture style were not necessarily found within the architecture, but were rather environmental markers, such as the sounds of prayer, the city around it, the events that occurred there. The example given is that we can only truly know that a building is a mosque by what happens there, rather than by visual cues. Specific features that are notably related to Islamic Architecture#—the Mihrab, the Minaret, and the Gate#—are seen in multiple locations and do not always serve the same use, and symbolism for being Islamic in nature is seen to be demonstrated more culturally than it is architecturally. Islamic Architecture is also sometimes referred to as a 'hidden architecture', one that doesn't necessarily show the physical traits of the style, rather it is something that is experienced.

Connections and deeper meanings

Difficulty forming connections 
Islamic architecture is a neglected subject within historical studies of world architecture. Many scholars that study historical architecture often gloss over, if not completely ignore Islamic structures. This is caused by multiple elements, one being that there are little historic literary works that express an Islamic architect's motives with their structures. Due to the wide geographic range of the Islamic religion, there is a large variation between thousands of existing mosques with little consistency between them. Lastly, since it is against the Islamic faith to idolize earthly beings, any depictions of earthly beings lack religious connection. These characteristics combine to make it difficult for historians to form symbolic connections from architecture in Islamic places of worship. Some authors have attempted to ascribe mystical or mathematical symbolisms to various aspects Islamic architecture. However, while these symbolic meanings may be plausible for certain specific buildings, they are not necessarily applicable to the rest of Islamic architecture.

Religious and societal connections 
Unlike Christianity, Islam does not sensationalize living beings because it is viewed as a conflict with the Qur'an. From an Islamic viewpoint, anything created by God is under his order and thus should not be idolized. This leaves typical religious Western symbols out of the picture, and replaces them with an emphasis on complex geometrical shapes and patterns.

There are several aspects of Islamic architecture that to modern knowledge lack a symbolic religious meaning, but there are connections that do exist. A repeated and significant motif in mosques is calligraphy. Calligraphy plays a huge role in delivering religious connections through artistic design. Calligraphy, in a mosque setting, is specifically used to reference excerpts from both the Qur'an and Muhammad's teachings. These references are one of the few religious connections architects include within their work.

Status and hierarchy 
Islamic architecture varies vastly across the world. Specifically, some mosques have different goals and intentions than others. These intentions often highlighted religious and social hierarchies within the mosque. Mosques are designed to have the least significant portions of the layout closest to the entrance, as people move deeper into the building more significant religious areas are revealed. Hierarchy is also present because certain Islamic architects are tasked to design specifically for the presence of royalty, although in Islamic belief all Muslims in the mosque are equal. Designated locations had been carefully chosen in the mosque to highlight an individual's position in society. This emphasis could be made by being within view to all attendees, by being placed in the focal point of artistry, or with a maqsurah.

Maintaining a sociological hierarchy within a mosque would typically represent a recognition by a higher being aware of a delegation of power. This hierarchy does exist but not with any sort of religious message as Hillenbrand points out, "in neither case is this hierarchy employed for especially portentous ends." Hierarchy exists in the church in different forms, but is meant for purely functional purposes.

Structural intentions 
Deeper meanings in Islamic architecture often take form as functional purposes. For example, mosques are built around the idea that it should not just be a place of mesmerizing aesthetics, but a place where the aesthetics' fluidity guide the person into proper worship.

A key feature of the mosque is the mihrab, a universal part of any Islamic place of worship. The mihrab is easily identifiable through a receding wall and a gable overhead often consisting of intricate patterns. Upon entering, the most crucial religious function the architecture of the mosque serves to deliver is the qibla. The qibla is necessary for proper Islamic worship, and is revealed through architectural means.

Threats and conservation 

Some prominent examples of Islamic architecture, like the Citadel and Great Mosque of Aleppo, have suffered significant damage in the ongoing Syrian Civil War and other wars in the Middle East.

Contemporary Muslim architects 

 Fazlur Khan
 Abdel-Wahed El-Wakil
 Vedat Dalokay
 Kamran Afshar Naderi
 T.Abdul Hussain Thariani
 Fahraddin Miralay
 Muzharul Islam
 Mubashra Ilyas
 Nabih Youssef
 Bashirul Haq
 Zaha Hadid
 Nayyar Ali Dada
 Habib Fida Ali
 Hassan Fathy
 Mimar Sinan

See also 

 Archnet, database of Islamic architecture
 Gozo Farmhouse
 Turbah
 Well House

References

Citations

Sources

Further reading

External links 
 ARCHITECTURE OF ISLAM by Takeo Kamiya (Half in English and half in Japanese)
 ARCHNET Open access, online resource on architecture and art of Muslim societies, globally and throughout history to our times
 Fatimid-era Ayyubid Wall of Cairo Digital Media Archive (creative commons-licensed photos, laser scans, panoramas), data from an Aga Khan Foundation/CyArk research partnership
 Islamic Arts and Architecture website
 Tehranimages. Contemporary photos taken in some of the oldest districts of Tehran.
 10,000+ Architectural collections worldwide   Islamic Art And Architecture designs worldwide.

 
Islamic art
Islamic architectural elements